Zhang Bo or Bo Zhang may refer to:

 Li Yan (Wu) (died 918), politician of the Tang dynasty and Wu state
 Zhang Bo (footballer) (born 1985), Chinese footballer
 Zhang Bo (actor), Chinese actor
 Zhang Bo (figure skater), Chinese female figure skater